Thanksgiving prayer or prayer of Thanksgiving may refer to:

any prayer of thankfulness
a prayer offered at Thanksgiving
Thanksgiving after Communion, a practice in certain Christian churches
Prayer of Thanksgiving, a Gnostic text from Nag Hammadi
"Thanksgiving Prayer", a song from the 1978 film The Magic of Lassie
"Thanksgiving Day, Nov. 28, 1986", a poem by William S. Burroughs from his 1989 book Tornado Alley
"A Thanksgiving Prayer", a reading of the poem, set to music by Frank Denning, from Burroughs's 1990 album Dead City Radio
Thanksgiving Prayer, a 1991 short film of Burroughs reading the poem, by Gus Van Sant

See also
Thanksgiving (disambiguation)